Wang Binyu (April 30, 1977 – October 19, 2005), was a Chinese migrant labourer executed for murder in China in 2005. His case attracted some sympathy within China and raised inequality issues.

History
Born in a poor family in Gansu, Wang Binyu went to work at a factory in the neighbouring Ningxia Hui Autonomous Region.  These two regions are in a dry climate that is in the thinly-populated interior of China, sometimes referred to as "China's Wild West", though geographically they are north-central.

Wang Binyu needed money to pay for an operation for his father - both education and medical care are currently charged for in China.  He was working for a subcontractor, who withheld some money and claimed some was owed as expenses.  While trying to force the subcontractor to pay him, Wang got into a fight with some co-workers and killed four people.  Despite this, his case has attracted some sympathy within China.

In a jailhouse, Mr. Wang said that he wanted to die so that he could no longer be exploited, and expressed remorse for his murders. Wang hoped that the party and the country would value migrant laborers. He was executed in October 2005, aged 28.

References

External links
 In China, the jolt of a life and a death - International Herald Tribune.
 China Elections - To kill him or not? – The case of Wang Binyu
 Convicted migrant worker killer waits for final verdict (China Daily).
 China Digital Times
Debate about inequality in China:
China warns on wage gap 'unrest' (BBC)
Income gap in China reaches alert level (China Daily)

1977 births
2005 deaths
Executed People's Republic of China people
21st-century executions by China
People from Tianshui
Executed people from Gansu
People convicted of murder by the People's Republic of China
Chinese mass murderers
Executed mass murderers